El Larguero (lit, The Crossbar) is a Spanish radio sports program that concentrates mostly on football discussion. The program began on Cadena SER in 1989, and is broadcast daily from 11:30 pm to 1:30 am. It is the most listened-to nighttime Spanish radio program, and is presented from Sundays to Thursdays by its director José Ramón de la Morena, and Fridays and Saturdays by Yago de Vega.

Segments of the program include sports results and fixtures, with interviews conducted by de la Morena, and sports analysis, with that of football particularly about Real Madrid and FC Barcelona.

References

External links 
Cadena SER
El Larguero homepage

Spanish radio programs
Cadena SER
1989 radio programme debuts